Burly (Burlı) is a rural locality (a selo) and the administrative centre of Burlinsky Selsoviet, Gafuriysky District, Bashkortostan, Russia. The population was 539 as of 2010. There are 10 streets.

Geography 
Burly is located 31 km north of Krasnousolsky (the district's administrative centre) by road. Yavgildy is the nearest rural locality.

References 

Rural localities in Gafuriysky District
Ufa Governorate